Bais Yaakov Machon Academy (also known as Bais Yaakov Machon) was a high school for Jewish girls. It primarily serviced the Jewish community located in Briarwood, Queens, New York City. Its primary goal was to help the Jewish community strengthen its Jewish education.

The school recently changed its name from Machon Academy to Bais Yaakov Machon and its location from Forest Hills to Briarwood.

Policy and history

Unlike most Bais Yaakov type schools, Bais Yaakov Machon does not assign a student a Hebrew level according to a student's grade. Rather, it places students in a "kvutza" system, where they are placed according to level instead of grade.

In September 2004, the administration of Bais Yaakov Machon removed the 7th and 8th grades due to space limitations. However, in September 2008, the grades were reinstated.

In August 2009 the school was shut down due to a lack of funds.

Uniform 

Uniforms are required and the requirement is strictly enforced. Failure to wear the uniform results in a fine.

Concert 
Every other year Bais Yaakov Machon holds a concert. It consists of drama, choir, and dance. It is held for women only.

References 

Orthodox Jewish schools for women
Jewish schools in the United States
Educational institutions disestablished in 2009
Defunct schools in New York City
Private high schools in Brooklyn
Private middle schools in Brooklyn
2009 disestablishments in New York (state)